= Olivia Obeng Owusu =

Ghanaian judge

Her Ladyship Justice Olivia Obeng Owusu is a Ghanaian High Court judge.

== Biography ==
In 2023, she was the presiding judge in Accra High Court.

In 2024, she was appointed by Nana Akufo-Addo to serve as Justice of the Court of Appeal along with 17 others.

She formerly served as a Treasurer, Greater Accra Regional Representative, Vice President and Organizing Secretary of the Association of Magistrates and Judges before she was elected in 2025, as the President of the Association. She is an executive of the 80th Anniversary Patrons group.
